The Constitution of the State of Hawaii refers to various legal documents that defined the fundamental principles of authority and governance within the Kingdom of Hawaii, Republic of Hawaii, Territory of Hawaii and State of Hawaii.

List of constitutions
1840 Constitution of the Kingdom of Hawaii
1852 Constitution of the Kingdom of Hawaii
1864 Constitution of the Kingdom of Hawaii
1887 Constitution of the Kingdom of Hawaii
1893 Constitution of the Kingdom of Hawaii
1894 Constitution of the Republic of Hawaii
1950 Hawaii State Constitutional Convention
1959 Hawaii State Constitutional Convention
1968 Hawaii State Constitutional Convention
1978 Hawaii State Constitutional Convention

Preamble
The preamble to the current Constitution of Hawaii states, "We, the people of the State of Hawaii, grateful for Divine Guidance, and mindful of our Hawaiian heritage, reaffirm our belief in a government of the people, by the people and for the people, and with an understanding heart toward all peoples of the earth do hereby ordain and establish this constitution for the State of Hawaii."

Bill of Rights
The preamble is followed by a twenty-point Bill of rights:

 All political power of this State is inherent in the people; and the responsibility for the exercise thereof rests with the people. All government is founded on this authority.
 All persons are free by nature and are equal in their inherent and inalienable rights. Among these rights are the enjoyment of life, liberty and the pursuit of happiness, and the acquiring and possessing property. These rights cannot endure unless the people recognize their corresponding obligations and responsibilities.
 No law shall be enacted respecting an establishment of religion, or prohibiting the free exercise thereof, or abridging the freedom of speech or of the press, or the right of the people peaceably to assemble and to petition the government for a redress of grievances.
 No person shall be deprived of life, liberty, or property without due process of law, nor be denied the equal protection of the laws, nor be denied the enjoyment of his civil rights or be discriminated against in the exercise thereof because of race, religion, sex or ancestry.
 The right of the people to be secure in their persons, houses, papers and effects against unreasonable searches, seizures, and invasions of privacy shall not be violated; and no warrants shall issue but upon probable cause, supported by oath or affirmation, particularly describing the place to be searched and the persons or things to be seized or the communications sought to be intercepted.
 No citizen shall be disfranchised, or deprived of any of the rights or privileges secured to other citizens, unless by the law of the land.
 No citizen shall be denied enlistment in any military organization of this State nor be segregated therein because of race, religious principles or ancestry.
 No person shall be held to answer for a capital or otherwise infamous crime, unless on a presentment or indictment of a grand jury, except in cases arising in the armed forces when in actual service in time of war or public danger; nor shall any person be subject for the same offense to be twice put in jeopardy; nor shall any person be compelled in any criminal case to be a witness against himself.
 Excessive bail shall not be required, nor excessive fines imposed, nor cruel or unusual punishment inflicted. The court may dispense with bail if reasonably satisfied that the defendant or witness will appear when directed, except for a defendant charged with an offense punishable by life imprisonment.
 In suits at common law where the value in controversy shall exceed one hundred dollars, the right of trial by jury shall be preserved. The legislature may provide for a verdict by not less than three-fourths of the members of the jury.
 In all criminal prosecutions, the accused shall enjoy the right to a speedy and public trial, by an impartial jury of the district wherein the crime shall have been committed, which district shall have been previously ascertained by law, or of such other district to which the prosecution may be removed with the consent of the accused; to be informed of the nature and cause of the accusation; to be confronted with the witnesses against him; to have compulsory process for obtaining witnesses in his favor; to have the assistance of counsel for his defense. The State shall provide counsel for an indigent defendant charged with an offense punishable by imprisonment for more than sixty days.
 No person shall be disqualified to serve as a juror because of sex.
 The privilege of the writ of habeas corpus shall not be suspended, unless when in cases of rebellion or invasion the public safety may require it. The power of suspending the privilege of the writ of habeas corpus, and the laws or the execution thereof, shall never be exercised except by the legislature, or by authority derived from it to be exercised in such particular cases only as the legislature shall expressly prescribe.
 The military shall be held in strict subordination to the civil power.
 A well regulated militia being necessary to the security of a free state, the right of the people to keep and bear arms shall not be infringed.
 No soldier or member of the militia shall, in time of peace, be quartered in any house, without the consent of the owner or occupant, nor in time of war, except in a manner prescribed by law.
 There shall be no imprisonment for debt.
 Private property shall not be taken or damaged for public use without just compensation.
 The power of the State to act in the general welfare shall never be impaired by the making of any irrevocable grant of special privileges or immunities.
 The enumeration of rights and privileges shall not be construed to impair or deny others retained by the people.

External links

1950 constitution text
Hawaii Constitution site
 Hawaiian Homes Commission Act, 1920 as amended from the Hawaiian Department of Hawaiian Home Lands
 Hawaiian Homes Commission Act, 1920 (PDF/details) as amended in the GPO Statute Compilations collection

1978 in law
Constitution of Hawaii
Hawaii
1978 in Hawaii
1978 in American law